Lyonetia scriptifera is a moth in the  family Lyonetiidae. It is known to live in Australia.

As with many other species of this family, they probably mine the leaves of their host plant in the larval stage.

External links
Australian Faunal Directory

Lyonetiidae